Jakubowice may refer to the following places in Poland:
Jakubowice, Lower Silesian Voivodeship (south-west Poland)
Jakubowice, Lublin Voivodeship (east Poland)
Jakubowice, Lesser Poland Voivodeship (south Poland)
Jakubowice, Opatów County in Świętokrzyskie Voivodeship (south-central Poland)
Jakubowice, Pińczów County in Świętokrzyskie Voivodeship (south-central Poland)
Jakubowice, Włoszczowa County in Świętokrzyskie Voivodeship (south-central Poland)
Jakubowice, Głubczyce County in Opole Voivodeship (south-west Poland)
Jakubowice, Kędzierzyn-Koźle County in Opole Voivodeship (south-west Poland)
Jakubowice, Kluczbork County in Opole Voivodeship (south-west Poland)
Jakubowice, Namysłów County in Opole Voivodeship (south-west Poland)
Jakubowice, Opole County in Opole Voivodeship (south-west Poland)